Dancing the Blues is an album by American blues artist Taj Mahal, released in 1993.

Reception

Allmusic gave a positive review of the album, calling the music "inclusive" and "eclectic", and praising a number of the individual tracks.

Track listing
 "Blues Ain't Nothin'" (Taj Mahal) – 4:12
 "Hard Way" (Grover McDaniel, T-Bone Walker) – 2:51
 "Strut" (Mahal) – 3:39
 "Going to the River" (Dave Bartholomew, Fats Domino) – 6:30
 "Mockingbird" (Charlie Foxx, Inez Foxx) – 3:54
 "Blue Light Boogie" (Jessie Mae Robinson) – 4:03
 "The Hoochi Coochi Coo" (Hank Ballard, Billy Myles) – 2:54 
 "That's How Strong My Love Is" (Roosevelt Jamison) – 3:07 
 "Down Home Girl" (Arthur Butler, Jerry Leiber) – 3:40
 "Stranger in My Own Home Town" (Percy Mayfield) – 2:42
 "Sitting on Top of the World" (Lonnie Chatmon, Walter Vinson) – 3:28 
 "I'm Ready" (Sylvester Bradford, Fats Domino) – 3:53
CD Bonus Track
 "I Can't Help Myself (Sugarpie Honeybunch)" (Brian Holland, Lamont Dozier & Edward Holland) – 2:43

Personnel 
Taj Mahal – Lead Vocals, Organ, Guitar, Harmonica, Piano, Steel Guitar, Liner Notes
Sir Harry Bowens – Background Vocals 
Tony Braunagel – Percussion, Drums
Kurt DeMunbrun – Design
Chuck Domanico – Upright Bass
Jerry Finn – Second Engineer
Bob Glaub – Bass
Ron Goldstein – Executive Producer
Marty Grebb – Alto, Baritone & Tenor Saxophone, Background Vocals
Helix Hadar – Second Engineer
Richie Hayward – Drums
Etta James – Vocals
William H. Johnson – Illustrations
Darrell Leonard – Trombone, Trumpet, Trombonium
Stephen Marcussen – Mastering
Joe McGrath – Percussion, Engineer
Ian McLagan – Organ, Piano
Bill Payne – Piano
Melanie Penny – Art Direction
John Porter – Guitar, Producer
Michito Sanchez – Percussion, Conga
Johnny Lee Schell – Guitar, Background Vocals
Joe Sublett – Soprano & Tenor Saxophone
Texacali Horns – Horn
Rich Veltrop – Second Engineer
Robin Visotsky – Photography
Mick Weaver – Organ

References

Taj Mahal (musician) albums
1993 albums
Albums produced by John Porter (musician)